An election to Buckinghamshire County Council took place on 2 May 2013 as part of the 2013 United Kingdom local elections.  49 councillors were elected from electoral divisions which returned one county councillor each by first-past-the-post voting for a four-year term of office.  Following a boundary review, the size of the council was reduced from 57 to 49 members for this election.  No elections were held in Milton Keynes, which is a unitary authority outside the area covered by the County Council.  The council continues to be administered on the Leader and Cabinet model. The Conservative Party won a reduced majority on the council.

All locally registered electors (British, Irish, Commonwealth and European Union citizens) who were aged 18 or over on Thursday 2 May 2013 were entitled to vote in the local elections. Those who were temporarily away from their ordinary address (for example, away working, on holiday, in student accommodation or in hospital) were also entitled to vote in the local elections, although those who had moved abroad and registered as overseas electors cannot vote in the local elections. It is possible to register to vote at more than one address (such as a university student who had a term-time address and lives at home during holidays) at the discretion of the local Electoral Register Office, but it remains an offence to vote more than once in the same local government election.

Summary
Suffering the loss of 335 of 1451 councillors in simultaneous elections across England, the Conservative Party won 36 seats, and saw their majority on the council cut from 17 seats to 11. Meanwhile, the main opposition group on the council altered from the Liberal Democrats to UKIP who won their highest percentage of the vote since their 1993 formation, at 27%. The Labour Party won its first seat here since the 2005 election, in Buckingham West. Seven of twelve Liberal Democrats lost their seats, to Conservative, UKIP and Labour candidates. An independent candidate won the West Wycombe electoral division that replaced Stokenchurch, Radnage & West Wycombe.

Results

|}

The overall turnout was 30.2% with a total of 116,182 valid votes cast. A total of 533 ballots were rejected.

Council Composition
Following the last election in 2009 the composition of the council was:

After the election, the composition of the council was:

Lib Dems – Liberal Democrats 
L – Labour Party
I – Independent

Ward results
An asterisk denotes an incumbent seeking re-election.

Abbey

Amersham and Chesham Bois

Martin Phillips previously served as councillor for Amersham prior to the boundaries being changed before this set of elections.

Aston Clinton and Bierton

Bill Chapple previously served as councillor for Aston Clinton prior to the boundaries being changed before this set of elections.

Aylesbury East

Aylesbury North

Raj Khan previously served as councillor for Aylesbury East prior to the boundaries being changed before this set of elections.

Aylesbury North West

Niknam Hussain previously served as councillor for Aylesbury North prior to the boundaries being changed before this set of elections.

Aylesbury South East

Brian Roberts previously served as councillor for Aylesbury South prior to the boundaries being changed before this set of elections.

Aylesbury South West

Freda Roberts previously served as councillor for Aylesbury West prior to the boundaries being changed before this set of elections.

Aylesbury West

Beaconsfield

Bernwood

Margaret Aston previously served as councillor for Haddenham prior to the boundaries being changed before this set of elections.

Booker, Cressex & Castlefield

Zahir Mohammed previously served as councillor for Downley, Disraeli, Oakridge & Castlefield prior to the boundaries being changed before this set of elections.

Buckingham East

Buckingham West

Chalfont St Giles

Timothy Butcher previously served as councillor for The Chalfonts & Seer Green prior to the boundaries being changed before this set of elections.

Chalfont St Peter

Chesham

Mohmammad Bhatti previously served as Conservative councillor for Chesham East prior to the boundaries being changed before this set of elections.

Chess Valley

Chiltern Ridges

Chiltern Villages

Cliveden

Dev Dhillon previously served as councillor for Taplow, Dorney & Lent Rise prior to the boundaries being changed before this set of elections.

Denham

Roger Reed previously served as councillor for Gerards Cross & Denham North prior to the boundaries being changed before this set of elections.

Downley

Wendy Mallen previously served as councillor for Downley, Disraeli, Oakridge & Castleford prior to the boundaries being changed before this set of elections.

Farnham Common & Burnham Beeches

Lin Hazell previously served as councillor for Burnham Beeches prior to the boundaries being changed before this set of elections.

Flackwell Heath, Little Marlow & Marlow South East

David Watson previously served as councillor for Thames prior to the boundaries being changed before this set of elections.

Gerrards Cross

Peter Hardy previously served as councillor for Bulstrode prior to the boundaries being changed before this set of elections.

Great Brickhill

Great Missenden

Grendon Underwood

Hazlemere

Iver

Ivinghoe

Little Chalfont & Amersham Common

Martin Tett previously served as councillor for The Chalfonts & Seer Green prior to the boundaries being changed before this set of elections.

Marlow

Penn Wood & Old Amersham

David Schofield previously served as councillor for Penn, Coleshill & Holmer Green prior to the boundaries being changed before this set of elections.

Ridgeway East

David Carroll previously served as councillor for Hazlemere prior to the boundaries being changed before this set of elections.

Ridgeway West

Carl Etholen previously served as councillor for The Risborough prior to the boundaries being changed before this set of elections.

Ryemead & Micklefield

Julia Wassell previously served as councillor for Bowerdean, Micklefield & Totteridge prior to the boundaries being changed before this set of elections.

Stoke Poges & Wexham

Trevor Egleton previously served as councillor for Stoke Poges & Farnham Common prior to the boundaries being changed before this set of elections.

Stone and Waddesdon

Terriers & Amersham Hill

The Risboroughs

The Wooburns, Bourne End & Hedsor

Michael Appleyard previously served as councillor for Thames prior to the boundaries being changed before this set of elections.

Totteridge & Bowerdean

Chaudhary Ditta previously served as councillor for Bowerdean, Micklefield & Totteridge prior to the boundaries being changed before this set of elections.

Tylers Green & Loudwater

David Shakespeare previously served as councillor for Ryemead, Tylers Green & Loudwater prior to the boundaries being changed before this set of elections.

Wendover, Halton & Stoke Mandeville

West Wycombe

Wing

Winslow

Notes

References

Buckinghamshire County Council elections
2013 English local elections
2010s in Buckinghamshire